Abdelhakim Elouaari (born 4 September 1980) is a French former professional footballer who played as a midfielder.

Career
Elouaari was born in Charleville-Mézières. He played on the professional level in Ligue 2 for Reims. He also played for Angoulême and Romorantin before joining Albi in January 2006.

Personal life 
His brother Hicham Elouaari is also a former footballer.

References

External links
 

1980 births
Living people
Association football midfielders
French footballers
Ligue 2 players
Stade de Reims players
Angoulême Charente FC players
US Albi players
Paris FC players
AS Moulins players
FC Libourne players
Aviron Bayonnais FC players
SO Romorantin players
Genêts Anglet players
People from Charleville-Mézières
French sportspeople of Moroccan descent
Footballers from Grand Est
Sportspeople from Ardennes (department)